Cone-rod homeobox protein is a protein that in humans is encoded by the CRX gene.

Function 

The protein encoded by this gene is a photoreceptor-specific transcription factor which plays a role in the differentiation of photoreceptor cells. This homeodomain protein is necessary for the maintenance of normal cone and rod function. Mutations in this gene are associated with photoreceptor degeneration, Leber's congenital amaurosis type III and the autosomal dominant cone-rod dystrophy 2. Several alternatively spliced transcript variants of this gene have been described, but the full-length nature of some variants has not been determined.

Mammalian CRX encodes a 299 amino acid protein containing a DNA binding homeodomain (HD) near its N-terminus followed by glutamine rich (Gln), and basic amino acid regions, then a C-terminal transactivation domain (AD). While structural biochemistry has demonstrated that the CRX HD adopts a canonical homeodomain protein fold, the AD is predicted to be flexible and disordered. The structural attributes of the CRX AD have yet to be solved.

Evolution 
CRX is a divergent duplicate of OTX produced during the 2 rounds of vertebrate whole genome duplication.

In the eutherian mammals, CRX has again duplicated by tandem gene duplication, with six ancestral duplicates, which are collectively referred to as ETCHbox genes.

References

Further reading

External links 
  GeneReviews/NCBI/NIH/UW entry on Retinitis Pigmentosa Overview
 
 

Transcription factors